Mehakari Dam, (also called as Mekhari dam) is an earthfill dam on Mehakari River near Ashti, Beed district in the state of Maharashtra in India.

Specifications

Purpose
 Irrigation

See also
 Dams in Maharashtra
 List of reservoirs and dams in India

References

Dams in Beed district
Dams completed in 1966
1966 establishments in Maharashtra